= Amos Scott =

American politician

Amos Scott (November 21, 1859 - ?) was a businessman and judge in Philadelphia, Pennsylvania. He was elected a magistrate in 1921 and became the first African American to hold that office in Philadelphia. He and Max Barber were leading political figures in Philadelphia's African American community. December 31, 1924 he was reported to have been cleared after an investigation.

He was born in Peach Bottom, Pennsylvania. He married Malvina Gurley and had 3 daughters. He operated Hotel Scott on 12th and Pine streets.
